Valvetty, is a small town in Jaffna District in the northeast region of the Jaffna Peninsula in Northern Province, Sri Lanka. It is located south of the larger town of Valvettithurai, and northeast of the small town of Udupiddy.

Etymology
The name Valvetty derives from the two Tamil words vallai meaning "forest" and veṭṭi meaning "expansive".

See also
 List of towns in Northern Province, Sri Lanka

External links

Towns in Jaffna District
Vadamarachchi South West DS Division